The Jazzihorn is a mountain of the Pennine Alps, located on the Swiss-Italian border. On the Italian side it is named Pizzo Cingino Nord as another summit is named Pizzo Cingino Sud on the south. The Jazzihorn has an elevation of 3,227 metres above sea level and lies between the valleys of Saastal (Valais) and Valle d'Antrona (Piedmont).

References

External links
 Jazzihorn on Hikr

Mountains of the Alps
Mountains of Piedmont
Mountains of Valais
Alpine three-thousanders
Italy–Switzerland border
International mountains of Europe
Mountains of Switzerland